In mathematics, the Noether inequality, named after Max Noether, is a property of compact minimal complex surfaces that restricts the topological type of the underlying topological 4-manifold. It holds more generally for minimal projective surfaces of general type over an algebraically closed field.

Formulation of the inequality
Let X be a smooth minimal projective surface of general type defined over an algebraically closed field (or a smooth minimal compact complex surface of general type) with canonical divisor K = −c1(X), and let pg = h0(K) be the dimension of the space of holomorphic two forms, then

For complex surfaces, an alternative formulation expresses this inequality in terms of topological invariants of the underlying real oriented  four manifold. Since a surface of general type is a Kähler surface, the dimension of the maximal positive subspace in intersection form on the second cohomology is given by b+ = 1 + 2pg. Moreover, by the Hirzebruch signature theorem c12 (X) = 2e + 3σ, where e = c2(X) is the topological Euler characteristic and σ = b+ − b− is the signature of the intersection form. Therefore, the Noether inequality can also be expressed as

or equivalently using e = 2 – 2 b1 + b+ + b−

Combining the Noether inequality with the Noether formula 12χ=c12+c2 gives

where q is the irregularity of a surface, which leads to
a slightly weaker inequality, which is also often called the Noether inequality:

Surfaces where equality holds (i.e. on the Noether line) are called Horikawa surfaces.

Proof sketch
It follows from the minimal general type condition that K2 > 0. We may thus assume that pg > 1, since the inequality is otherwise automatic.  In particular, we may assume there is an effective divisor D representing K.  We then have an exact sequence

so 

Assume that D is smooth. By the adjunction formula D has a canonical linebundle , therefore  is a special divisor and the Clifford inequality applies, which gives

In general, essentially the same argument applies using a more general version of the Clifford inequality for local complete intersections with a dualising line bundle and 1-dimensional sections in the trivial line bundle.  These conditions are satisfied for the curve D by the adjunction formula and the fact that D is numerically connected.

References
 

Inequalities
Algebraic surfaces